Ali Montazeri (Ali Montazeri Moghaddam, born September 2, 1958) is an Iranian public health scientist at the Health Metrics Research Center of the Iranian Institute for Health Sciences Research. He is editor-in-chief of an Iranian health journal: Payesh (Health Monitor-the journal of Iranian Institute for Health Sciences Research) and the associate editor of Health and Quality of Life Outcomes  and academic editor for PLOS One. He has been three times the director of Academic Center for Education, Culture and Research.

Education
Montazeri received his PhD from University of Glasgow; his thesis concerned the quality of life in lung cancer patients, and was jointly supervised by Charles Gillis and James McEwen.

Research
Montazeri published a paper in 2004 that found that knowledge of cancer diagnosis does not change how a person fills out a questionnaire about his or her quality of life. In a 2012 book chapter, he proposed that research be conducted to see how quality of life in people with cancer is affected by the way a cancer diagnosis is disclosed and how the person's level of education affects quality of life.

He also published papers in 2002, 2003, and 2015 about the epidemiology of breast cancer and breast cancer preventive behaviors such as breast self-examination

In 2008, he published a review of the literature on quality of life in people with breast cancer.

References

External links
Listing on Departmental web page

Iranian epidemiologists
Alumni of the University of Glasgow
1958 births
Living people
People from Tehran